The Star is a daily newspaper based in Gauteng, South Africa. The paper is distributed mainly in Gauteng and other provinces such as Mpumalanga, Limpopo, North West, and Free State.

The Star is one of the titles of the South African Independent News & Media group (INL), owned by Sekunjalo Media Consortium whose founder and chairman is Dr. Iqbal Survé. For many years, The Star was owned by the Argus Printing & Publishing Company, controlled by the Anglo American Corporation. The Irish Independent News & Media (INM) bought and renamed the Argus in the early 1990s. Sekujalo acquired INL in 2013.

Content 
The content published in The Star focuses on leading daily national, local and international national news and analysis. Its leader and opinion page offers a platform for thought leaders to contribute their opinions on topical news.

Products 
The Star houses the Business Report newspaper (a widely-read financial newspaper in South Africa), as well as a carrier for the following supplements:

 Tonight 
 Talent 360 
 Drive 360 
 Classifieds

Awards 
Newspaper Journalism Awards 2012

 Hard News: Angelique Serrao "Gauteng toll roads" 
 Feature photographs: Antoine de Ras "The Long Road Home"
 Hard News: Louise Flanagan "92 million: Zuma's political elite benefit" 
 Enterprise News: Lebogang Seale "Raped by the justice system" 
 Feature Writing: Beauregard Tromp "The weight of water" Jonathan Ancer "Adventures of an AWOL Chequebook" shared with our sister paper Cape Times
 News photographs: Antoine de Ras "Mogadishu Madness"
 Feature photographs: Antoine de Ras "The Long Road Home""
 Sports photographs: Adrian de Kock "Polo Pigeons" Standard Bank 2013 Sikuvile Journalism Awards
 Rising Star of the Year: Kristen van Schie Vast Number of Entries Standard Bank 2014 Sikuvile Journalism Awards
 Hard News: Angelique Serrao, Botho Molosankwe, Kristen Van Schie, Lebogang Seale & Kevin Ritchie Deadly Valentine (Series).
 Enterprise News: Kristen van Schie After the Fall.
 Popular Journalism: Omphitlhetse Mooki Hell Hath no Fury like a Woman Scorned.
 Newspaper Journalist of the Year: Antoine de Ras Oscar Pistorius Standard Bank 2015 Sikuvile Journalism Awards
 Hard News: Botho Molosankwe, Timothy Bernard, Theresa Taylor & Omphitlhetse Mooki "Joburg's Raging Fires - Firefight Scandal"
 Hard News: Botho Molosankwe "What a Bummer" 
 Graphic Journalism: Sithembile Mtolo "Greening your home" 
 News Photographs: Bongiwe Mchunu "Extinguisher" Standard Bank 2016 Sikuvile Journalism Awards
 Enterprise News: The Star Women's Team 2016 "The Rise of Women's Power"
 Graphic Journalism: Lebohang Elvin Nethononda "Soweto Uprising 1976"
 Presentation: Narianan Nelandri "16 June: 40 Years On"
 Young Journalist of the Year: Nokuthula Mbatha "Deep in the Devil's Drug" National Arts Festival/BASA Arts Journalism Awards 2016 
 News: Silver Winners Wendyl Martin shared with its sister publication Weekend Argus

Notable stories

The Bang-Bang Club
The Star newspaper employed three members of the Bang-Bang Club. It employed Kevin Carter as a staff photographer in 1984. Ken Oosterbroek worked for the paper before being appointed its chief photographer in August 1991. João Silva was hired shortly afterwards.

History
The Star newspaper appeared for the first time in Johannesburg as The Eastern Star. It was founded in Grahamstown under that title on 6 January 1871 (as a resurrection of the previous Great Eastern paper), and was moved to the Witwatersrand sixteen years later by its owners, brothers Thomas and George Sheffield. In 1889, the name Eastern Star was changed to the one currently in use.

Supplements
Business Report (Monday-Friday)
Tonight (Monday-Friday)
Workplace (Monday & Wednesday)
Motoring (Thursday)
Play (monthly)

Distribution areas

Distribution figures

Readership figures

See also
 List of newspapers in South Africa

References

External links
The Stars Official Website
 SAARF Website

Daily newspapers published in South Africa
Mass media in Johannesburg
Publications established in 1871